Seyed Abolfazl Jalali Bourani (born 26 June 1998) is an Iranian professional footballer who plays as a defender for Persian Gulf Pro League club Esteghlal and the Iran national team.

Club career

Saipa
He made his debut for Saipa in 12th fixtures of 2018–19 Iran Pro League against Machine Sazi while he substituted in for Moein Abbasian.

Esteghlal
Jalali joined Esteghlal Tehran in the 21st League transfers.

International career
He played his first national match on 10 April 2021 at the age of 23 against Syria, which ended with a score of 3-0 in favor of Iran.

Career statistics

Club

Honours

Esteghlal 
Iran Pro League: 2021–22
Iranian Super Cup: 2022

References

1998 births
Living people
People from Amol
Sportspeople from Mazandaran province
Iranian footballers
Association football defenders
Saipa F.C. players
Esteghlal F.C. players
Persian Gulf Pro League players
Iran international footballers
2022 FIFA World Cup players